"How Much Is It Worth to Live in L.A." is a song co-written and recorded by American country music artist Waylon Jennings.  It was released in September 1988 as the first single from the album Full Circle.  The song reached #38 on the Billboard Hot Country Singles & Tracks chart.  The song was written by Jennings and Roger Murrah.

Chart performance

References

1988 singles
1988 songs
Waylon Jennings songs
Songs written by Waylon Jennings
Songs written by Roger Murrah
Song recordings produced by Jimmy Bowen
MCA Records singles